Paterswolde is a village in the Dutch province of Drenthe. It is a part of the municipality of Tynaarlo, and lies about 8 km south of city of Groningen. Paterswolde and Eelde has merged into a single urban area, and are often referred to as Eelde-Paterswolde, however they remain separate villages.

A small part of the village, on the south end of the lake , lies in the province of Groningen, in the municipality of Groningen.

History 
The village was first mentioned in 1408 as Potterwolt, and means "the woods of Potter (person)". Paterswolde is a road village from the Early Middle Ages which started to develop when peat was excavation in the nearby raised bog.

During the 18th and 19th century, villas and estates were built in Paterswolde mainly by nobility and industrialists from the city of Groningen.

Paterswolde was home to 795 people in 1840. The  and the  became a water sports and recreational area during the 20th century. Between 1955 and 1956, the Assumption of Mary Church was built in Paterswolde.

Gallery

References

External links 

Groningen (city)
Tynaarlo
Populated places in Drenthe
Populated places in Groningen (province)